The DFA Remixes is a series of two remix compilations by influential dance-punk production duo The DFA (James Murphy and Tim Goldsworthy). Unlike previous DFA releases, these are remixes of other artists' work.

The first album in the series, Chapter One, was released on 27 March 2006 in the UK and 4 April 2006 in the US. The second album, Chapter Two, was released on the 2 October 2006 in the UK and 3 October in the US. The series was released on CD and vinyl with different track listings.

Chapter One

CD 
 Le Tigre – "Deceptacon" - 6:23
 Blues Explosion – "Mars, Arizona" - 10:42
 The Chemical Brothers – "The Boxer" - 9:36
 Soulwax – "Another Excuse" - 7:58
 Radio 4 – "Dance To The Underground" - 9:02
 Fischerspooner – "Emerge" - 4:16
 Gorillaz – "Dare" - 12:11
 Metro Area – "Orange Alert" - 5:41
 Hot Chip – "(Just Like We) Breakdown" - 8:32

Vinyl 
 A. Gorillaz - "Dare" - 12:11
 B. Radio 4 - "Dance To The Underground" - 9:02
 C1. Le Tigre - "Deceptacon" - 6:23
 C2. Metro Area - "Orange Alert" - 5:41
 D. Blues Explosion - "Mars, Arizona" - 10:42

Chapter Two

CD 
 Tiga - "Far From Home"
 Junior Senior - "Shake Your Coconuts"
 Hot Chip - "Colours"
 N.E.R.D - "She Wants To Move"
 Nine Inch Nails - "The Hand That Feeds"
 Goldfrapp - "Slide In"
 Chromeo - "Destination Overdrive"
 UNKLE - "In A State"

2x12" 
A. Tiga - "Far From Home" Instrumental
B1. Junior Senior - "Shake Your Coconuts"
B2. Chromeo - "Destination Overdrive"
C. Goldfrapp - "Slide In" Instrumental
D. UNKLE - "In A State"

Dance-punk albums
DFA Records albums
Compilation album series
2006 remix albums
DFA Records remix albums
DFA Records compilation albums
2006 compilation albums